Lokov is a village in Municipality of Struga, North Macedonia.

Population
Population of Lokov migrated to: Vojvodina, Struga, and Novo Lagovo.

References

Villages in Struga Municipality
Albanian communities in North Macedonia